Peter Haworth (Birth and Death dates unknown) was an English footballer.

Season-1889-90
Nothing is known about Peter Haworth except he deputised for John Lindsay, the regular Accrington goalkeeper and kept a clean-sheet in a 0–0 draw played at Thorneyholme Road against West Bromwich Albion on 8 February 1890. The Lancashire Evening Post of 10 February 1890 described the match as "tame". On Peter Haworth they wrote,"P Haworth of the reserves was tried in goal, and though got through with a clean sheet, he was rather lucky, as his habit of rushing out more than once seemed likely to cost a goal. He has plenty of pluck, however, and with a little coaching should develop into a good custodian".
Unfortunately, the Lancashire Evening Post prophecy did not come to pass and after the match Peter Haworth disappeared into the obscurity from whence he came.

References

English footballers
English Football League players
Accrington F.C. players
Date of death unknown
Association football goalkeepers